Kami Mengenang Rinto Harahap  is a compilation album featuring the works of .

Harahap, a noted Indonesian singer, died in February 2015. To commemorate his passing, a number of young musicians gathered to record his songs. Produced by the Recording Industry Association of Indonesia (ASIRI), Kami Mengenang Rinto Harahap features performances by NOAH, Geisha
, Nidji and d'Masiv.

All profits from the sale of this album will be given to Harahap's family.

Track list

References

2015 albums